Libor Pala (born 22 July 1961) is a Czech football coach. As well as leading teams in his native Czech Republic, he has coached clubs in Poland and the Middle East. He started his coaching career at the age of 28.

Before heading into management, Pala played football, although he only reached the Czech 2. Liga. Pala was the manager of FC Karviná in the 2000–01 Czech 2. Liga. He led Polish side Nowy Dwór into the 2003–04 Ekstraklasa, before moving to manage Lech Poznań.

Pala joined Ústí nad Labem in 2007, but his side were quickly knocked out of the 2007–08 Czech Cup in their first game.

References

1961 births
Living people
Czech footballers
Czech football managers
MFK Karviná managers
FK Ústí nad Labem managers
Lech Poznań managers
Pogoń Szczecin managers
Wisła Płock managers
Sportspeople from Karviná
Charles University alumni
Association footballers not categorized by position
Czech National Football League managers